Abraham Browning (July 16, 1808 – August 22, 1889) was the Attorney General of New Jersey from 1845 to 1850 and a prominent citizen of Camden County, New Jersey.

Biography
Browning was born near Camden in 1808 and entered the New Jersey bar in 1834. He was a delegate at the New Jersey Constitutional Convention in 1843, and later was appointed Attorney General under Governor Charles C. Stratton and stayed on during second tenure of Governor Daniel Haines.  He would later serve as a delegate to the 1864 Democratic National Convention.

Abraham Browning should not be confused with Capt. Abraham M. Browning (1843-1880), who owned a farm called Cherry Hill Farm in what  is now Cherry Hill NJ, on the site of the present-day Cherry Hill 

Capt. A.M. Browning's Cherry Hill Farm helped give Cherry Hill, New Jersey its name,  though there is evidence that the term goes back to the colonial period.

References

1808 births
1889 deaths
Politicians from Camden, New Jersey
People from Cherry Hill, New Jersey
New Jersey Attorneys General
New Jersey Democrats
19th-century American politicians